Jaël Sakura Bestué Ferrera (born 24 September 2000) is a Spanish sprinter.

Biography
Jaël Bestué was born on 24 September 2000. Her father's family is from Annobón, Equatorial Guinea.

She won a silver medal in the 200 m at the 2017 IAAF World U18 Championships, took bronze in the 200 m at the 2019 European Athletics U20 Championships, and was part of the silver medal winning team at the 4 × 100 metres relay at the 2021 European Athletics U23 Championships.

At the Spanish national championships she was won four times in the 4x100 Metres Relay (2015, 2016, 2019 and 2021), and three times at the 200m (2018, 2019,and 2020). She also won gold in the 60m at the 2019 national indoors championship.

Bestué competed in the 200m at the 2020 Summer Olympics. She recorded a personal best time of 23.19 in finishing fourth in her heat, but did not advance.

References

External links 
 
 
 
 

2000 births
Living people
Spanish female sprinters
Olympic female sprinters
Olympic athletes of Spain
Athletes (track and field) at the 2020 Summer Olympics
Athletes from Barcelona
Sportswomen from Catalonia
Spanish sportspeople of Equatoguinean descent